Carbotec Industrial Co. Ltd. is a Taiwanese bicycle manufacturer. The company sells its frames under its own brand and at the same time produces all frames made of carbon fiber reinforced polymers (CFRP) for the Italian brand Pinarello and some of the German brand Storck.

Carbotec has been manufacturing products from CFRP since 2004. In addition to bicycle frames and forks, the company's product range also includes CFRP rims.

References
 

Cycle manufacturers of Taiwan
Mountain bike manufacturers
Taiwanese brands
2004 establishments in Taiwan